Calytrix creswellii is a species of plant in the myrtle family Myrtaceae that is endemic to Western Australia.

It blooms between September and December producing white star shaped flowers.

Found on sandplains in the Goldfields-Esperance region of Western Australia scattered through an area north west of Kalgoorlie where it grows on sandy and sometimes gravelly soils over laterite.

The species was first formally described as Calycothrix creswellii by the botanist Ferdinand von Mueller in 1876 in the work Fragmenta Phytographiae Australiae. It was reclassified into the genus Calytrix by B. D. Jackson in 1893 in Index Kewensis.

References

Plants described in 1893
creswellii
Flora of Western Australia
Taxa named by Ferdinand von Mueller